Rodos may refer to:
 Rhodes, an island in Greece
 Rhodes (city)
 Rodos (operating system), a real-time operating system
 Rodos Colossi RFC, a rugby union club based in Rhodes, Greece
 Rodos F.C., a football club based in Rhodes, Greece
 HS Rodos (L157), an American-built landing craft, transferred to the Royal Hellenic Navy in 1960

See also
 Rhodes (disambiguation)